Arta olivalis, the olive arta moth, is a species of snout moth in the genus Arta. It was described by Augustus Radcliffe Grote in 1878, and is known from the southern United States.

The wingspan is about 14 mm.

References

Chrysauginae
Moths of North America
Fauna of the Southeastern United States
Moths described in 1878
Taxa named by Augustus Radcliffe Grote